Derek Jabez Hines (8 February 1931 - August 2001) was an English football player who played for Derby County, Shrewsbury Town, Rugby Town and most notably Leicester City.

During his time at Leicester he forged a prolific strike partnership with Arthur Rowley and helped Leicester to the Second Division title in both 1953-54 and 1956-57. He scored 117 goals in total for the club making him the club's 4th top goalscorer of all-time. He is also the last person to score 4 goals in one game for the club in a 6-3 victory over Aston Villa in November 1958.

He returned to the club for a spell as youth team coach in the 1970s.

References

1931 births
2001 deaths
Derby County F.C. players
Leicester City F.C. players
Rugby Town F.C. (1945) players
Shrewsbury Town F.C. players
Scottish footballers
Association football forwards
Footballers from Derbyshire